"Guess Who's Back" is a song by American rapper Scarface featuring American rappers Jay-Z and Beanie Sigel. It is the lead single from Scarface's seventh studio album The Fix (2002). The song was produced by Kanye West, who also provides uncredited vocals, and contains a sample of "Sunrise" by The Originals.

Background and composition
The song was first recorded in New York. Scarface then brought it to producer Mike Dean, who mixed the song at Rap A Lot studios in Houston.

For production, Kanye West used a looped sample of "Sunrise" by The Originals and layered it over the drums in the instrumental of "Xxplosive" by Dr. Dre.

Critical reception
In a review of The Fix, Pitchfork described the song as a "blazing track that wouldn't have sounded out of place on The Blueprint". Complex praised the song, calling it "a classic shit-talking, skill-flexing showdown".

Charts

References

2002 singles
2002 songs
Scarface (rapper) songs
Jay-Z songs
Beanie Sigel songs
Song recordings produced by Kanye West
Def Jam Recordings singles
Songs written by Jay-Z
Songs written by Beanie Sigel
Songs written by Kanye West